The 2015 Tour of Turkey was the 51st edition of the Presidential Cycling Tour of Turkey cycling stage race. It started on 26 April in Alanya and finished on 3 May in Istanbul.

Schedule

Teams
The start list included 21 teams (6 UCI WorldTeams, 14 Professional Continental Teams, and 1 Continental Team).

Stages

Stage 1
26 April 2015 — Alanya to Alanya,

Stage 2
27 April 2015 — Alanya to Antalya,

Stage 3
28 April 2015 — Kemer to Elmalı,

Stage 4
29 April 2015 — Fethiye to Marmaris,

Stage 5
30 April 2015 — Muğla to Pamukkale,

Stage 6
1 May 2015 — Denizli to Selçuk,

Stage 7
2 May 2015 — Selçuk to İzmir,

Stage 8
3 May 2015 — Istanbul to Istanbul,

Classification leadership

Final standings

General classification

Points classification

Mountains classification

Turkish Beauties classification

Team classification

References

External links

Tour of Turkey
Tour of Turkey
Presidential Cycling Tour of Turkey by year